Charles Manners-Sutton (17 February 1755 – 21 July 1828; called Charles Manners before 1762) was a bishop in the Church of England who served as Archbishop of Canterbury from 1805 to 1828.

Life
Manners-Sutton was the fourth son of Lord George Manners-Sutton (third son of John Manners, 3rd Duke of Rutland) and his wife Diana Chaplin, daughter of Thomas Chaplin. His younger brother was Thomas Manners-Sutton, 1st Baron Manners, Lord Chancellor of Ireland. His father, Lord George, had assumed the additional surname of Sutton in 1762 on inheriting – from his elder brother Lord Robert – the estates of their maternal grandfather Robert Sutton, 2nd Baron Lexinton.

Manners-Sutton was educated at Charterhouse School and Emmanuel College, Cambridge (matriculated 1773, graduated B.A. as 15th wrangler 1777, M.A. 1780, D.D. 1792).

He married at age 23, and probably eloped with, his cousin Mary Thoroton, daughter of Thomas Thoroton and his wife Mary (Levett) Thoroton of Screveton Hall, Nottinghamshire, in 1778. (Col. Thomas Blackborne Thoroton later moved to Flintham Hall, Flintham, near Screveton, Nottinghamshire. He was later known as Thomas Thoroton Hildyard. Both Thoroton and his stepbrother Levett Blackborne, Esq., a Lincoln's Inn barrister, had long acted as advisers to John Manners, 3rd Duke of Rutland, and Col. Thoroton was often resided at Belvoir Castle, the ancestral seat of the Dukes of Rutland.)

In 1785, Manners-Sutton was appointed to the family living at Averham with Kelham, in Nottinghamshire, and in 1791, became Dean of Peterborough. He was consecrated Bishop of Norwich in 1792, and two years later received the appointment of Dean of Windsor in commendam.

Archbishop of Canterbury
He had long been the favourite candidate for Canterbury. In late January 1805 in a standup furore at Windsor Castle, the King was furious to find out that the Prime Minister was trying to interfere.  Pitt's cronyism would eventually cause his downfall, and Manners Sutton was duly chosen to succeed John Moore as Archbishop of Canterbury. During his primacy, the old archepiscopal palace at Croydon was sold and the country palace of Addington was bought with the proceeds. He presided over the first meeting which issued in the foundation of the National Society, and subsequently lent the scheme his strong support. He also exerted himself to promote the establishment of the Indian episcopate. As Archbishop of Canterbury, Manners-Sutton appointed his cousin, Evelyn Levett Sutton, a chaplain to Lord Manners, as one of six preachers of Canterbury Cathedral in 1811.

In 1819, he presided over the christening of the future Queen Victoria at Kensington Palace.

He died at Lambeth on 21 July 1828, and was buried on 29 July at Addington, in a family vault.

Works
His only published works are two sermons, one preached before the Lords (London, 1794), the other before the Society for the Propagation of the Gospel (London, 1797).

Family

In 1778 he married Mary, daughter of Thomas Thoroton of Screveton, Nottinghamshire, by whom he had a family of two sons and ten daughters. His son Charles Manners-Sutton served as Speaker of the House of Commons and was created Viscount Canterbury in 1835. His grandson Henry Manners Chichester by his daughter Isabella was a prolific contributor to the Dictionary of National Biography.

References

Attribution

1755 births
1828 deaths
Archbishops of Canterbury
Bishops of Norwich
Deans of Windsor
People educated at Charterhouse School
Alumni of Emmanuel College, Cambridge
18th-century Church of England bishops
19th-century Anglican archbishops
Charles
Deans of Peterborough
Burials at St Mary's Church, Addington
19th-century Church of England bishops
18th-century Anglican theologians
19th-century Anglican theologians